Dame Jocelyn Barbara Hepworth  (10 January 1903 – 20 May 1975) was an English artist and sculptor. Her work exemplifies Modernism and in particular modern sculpture. Along with artists such as Ben Nicholson and Naum Gabo, Hepworth was a leading figure in the colony of artists who resided in St Ives during the Second World War.

Born in Wakefield, Yorkshire, Hepworth studied at Leeds School of Art and the Royal College of Art in the 1920s. She married the sculptor John Skeaping in 1925.  In 1931 she fell in love with the painter Ben Nicholson, and in 1933 divorced Skeaping.  At this time she was part of a circle of modern artists centred on Hampstead, London, and was one of the founders of the art movement Unit One.

At the beginning of the Second World War, Hepworth and Nicholson moved to St. Ives, Cornwall, where she would remain for the rest of her life.  Best known as a sculptor, Hepworth also produced drawings – including a series of sketches of operating rooms following the hospitalisation of her daughter in 1944 – and lithographs.  She died in a fire at her studio in 1975.

Biography

Early life
Jocelyn Barbara Hepworth was born on 10 January 1903 in Wakefield, West Riding of Yorkshire, the eldest child of Gertrude and Herbert Hepworth. Her father was a civil engineer for the West Riding County Council, who in 1921 advanced to the role of county surveyor. Hepworth attended Wakefield Girls' High School, where she was awarded music prizes at the age of 12 and won a scholarship to study at the Leeds School of Art from 1920. It was there that she met her fellow Yorkshireman, Henry Moore. They became friends and established a friendly rivalry that lasted professionally for many years.

Despite the difficulties of attempting to gain a position in what was a male-dominated environment, Hepworth successfully won a county scholarship to attend the Royal College of Art (RCA) in London and studied there from 1921 until she was awarded the diploma of the Royal College of Art in 1924.

Early career

Following her studies at the RCA, Hepworth travelled to Florence, Italy, in 1924 on a West Riding Travel Scholarship. Hepworth was also the runner-up for the Prix-de-Rome, which the sculptor John Skeaping won. After travelling with him to Siena and Rome, Hepworth married Skeaping in May 1925 in Florence. In Italy, Hepworth learned how to carve marble from sculptor Giovanni Ardini. Hepworth and Skeaping returned to London in 1926, where they exhibited their works together from their flat. Their son Paul was born in London in 1929. In 1931, Hepworth met and fell in love with abstract painter Ben Nicholson; however, both were still married at the time. Hepworth filed for divorce from Skeaping that year; they were divorced in March 1933.

Her early work was highly interested in abstraction and art movements on the continent. In 1931, Hepworth was the first to sculpt the pierced figures that are characteristic of both her own work and, later, that of Henry Moore. They would lead in the path to modernism in sculpture. In 1933, Hepworth travelled with Nicholson to France, where they visited the studios of Jean Arp, Pablo Picasso, and Constantin Brâncuși. Hepworth later became involved with the Paris-based art movement, Abstraction-Création. In 1933, Hepworth co-founded the Unit One art movement with Nicholson and Paul Nash, the critic Herbert Read, and the architect Wells Coates. The movement sought to unite Surrealism and abstraction in British art.

Hepworth also helped raise awareness of continental artists amongst the British public. In 1937, she designed the layout for Circle: An International Survey of Constructivist Art, a 300-page book that surveyed Constructivist artists and that was published in London and edited by Nicholson, Naum Gabo, and Leslie Martin.

Hepworth, with Nicholson, gave birth to triplets in 1934: Rachel, Sarah, and Simon. Hepworth, atypically, found a way to both take care of her children and continue producing her art. "A woman artist", she argued, "is not deprived by cooking and having children, nor by nursing children with measles (even in triplicate) – one is in fact nourished by this rich life, provided one always does some work each day; even a single half hour, so that the images grow in one's mind." Hepworth married Nicholson on 17 November 1938 at Hampstead Register Office in north London, following his divorce from his wife Winifred. Rachel and Simon also became artists.

St Ives

Hepworth, Nicholson and their children went to live in Cornwall at the outbreak of the Second World War in 1939. She lived in Trewyn Studios in St Ives from 1949 until her death in 1975. Trewyn Studios had once been an outbuilding of Trewyn House, later purchased by her pupil and assistant John Milne in 1956. She said that "Finding Trewyn Studio was sort of magic. Here was a studio, a yard, and garden where I could work in open air and space." St Ives had become a refuge for many artists during the war. On 8 February 1949, Hepworth and Nicholson co-founded the Penwith Society of Arts at the Castle Inn; 19 artists were founding members, including Peter Lanyon and Bernard Leach.

Hepworth was also a skilled draughtsperson. After her daughter Sarah was hospitalised in 1944, she struck up a close friendship with the surgeon Norman Capener. At Capener's invitation, she was invited to view surgical procedures and, between 1947 and 1949, she produced nearly 80 drawings of operating rooms in chalk, ink, and pencil. Hepworth was fascinated by the similarities between surgeons and artists, stating: "There is, it seems to me, a close affinity between the work and approach of both physicians and surgeons, and painters and sculptors."

In 1950, works by Hepworth were exhibited in the British Pavilion at the XXV Venice Biennale alongside works by Matthew Smith and John Constable. The 1950 Biennale was the last time that contemporary British artists were exhibited alongside artists from the past. Two early public commissions, Contrapunctal Forms and Turning Forms, were exhibited at the Festival of Britain in 1951.

During this period, Hepworth and Nicholson divorced (1951). Hepworth moved away from working only in stone or wood and began to work with bronze and clay. Hepworth often used her garden in St Ives, which she designed with her friend the composer Priaulx Rainier, to view her large-scale bronzes.

Death of son Paul

Her eldest son Paul was killed on 13 February 1953 in a plane crash while serving with the Royal Air Force in Thailand. A memorial to him, Madonna and Child, is in the parish church of St Ives.

Exhausted, in part from her son's death, Hepworth travelled to Greece with her friend Margaret Gardiner in August 1954. They visited Athens, Delphi and many of the Aegean Islands.

When Hepworth returned to St Ives from Greece in August 1954 she found that Gardiner had sent her a large shipment of Nigerian guarea hardwood. Although she received only a single tree trunk, Hepworth noted that the shipment from Nigeria to the Tilbury docks came in at 17 tons. Between 1954 and 1956 Hepworth sculpted six pieces out of guarea wood, many of which were inspired by her trip to Greece, such as Corinthos (1954) and Curved Form (Delphi) (1955).

Ambivalent burden of international reputation
It was also during this decade that Hepworth became preoccupied with the idea of establishing a market base for her work in the United States. Initially she hoped to follow Henry Moore's successful sale of artwork via Curt Valentin of Bucholz Gallery in New York. Negotiations with Valentin did result in a number of American sales, but despite the sales, and despite interventions by Hepworth's friends, Valentin rebuffed repeated requests to hold any substantial stock of her work. It was not until 1955, after the Martha Jackson Gallery had offered Hepworth the opportunity to exhibit in their space alongside works by William Scott and Francis Bacon, that Hepworth formalised gallery representation in the new world.

Hepworth's difficulties in establishing a stable gallery relationship in the United States have been attributed to many factors, including the artist's own diffidence regarding personal promotion of her work. When Martha Jackson failed to arrange the solo American exhibition of sculptures and drawings that Hepworth demanded, Hepworth moved, in 1957, to Galerie Chalette, run by Arthur and Madeleine Lejwa, known for their close relationship with Jean Arp, and dedication to close relationships with their artists.

The Lejwas came through with the solo exhibition Hepworth craved. Hepworth came to New York for the opening (her first visit to the city), but made minimal contact with the press and left as soon as possible. "Have seen all the press", she wrote, "pulled faces at the camera and generally done my best!"

Three years later, having secured the Dag Hammarskjöld Memorial Commission (Single Form, 1964), she left both Chalette and Gimpel Fils, her long-time home agent, for the larger Marlborough Fine Art and Marlborough-Gerson. "Pulled between personal loyalties and professional aspirations", Hepworth chose to forfeit the personal relationships.

Late career
Hepworth greatly increased her studio space in 1960 when she purchased the Palais de Danse, a former cinema and dance hall, that was situated across the street from Trewyn. She used this new space to work on large-scale commissions.

She also experimented with lithography in her late career, and produced two lithographic suites with the Curwen Gallery and its director Stanley Jones, one in 1969 and one in 1971. The latter was entitled "The Aegean Suite" (1971) and was inspired by Hepworth's trip to Greece in 1954 with Margaret Gardiner. The artist also produced a set of lithographs entitled "Opposing Forms" (1970) with Marlborough Fine Art in London.

Barbara Hepworth died in an accidental fire at her Trewyn studios on 20 May 1975 at the age of 72.

Famous sculptures

In 1951 Hepworth was commissioned by the Arts Council to create a piece for the Festival of Britain. The resulting work featured two Irish limestone figures entitled, "Contrapuntal Forms" (1950), which was displayed on London's South Bank; it was later donated to the New Town of Harlow and displayed in Glebelands, where it remains. To complete the large-scale piece Hepworth hired her first assistants, Terry Frost, Denis Mitchell, and John Wells.

From 1949 onwards she worked with assistants, 16 in all. One of her most prestigious works is Single Form, which was made in memory of her friend and collector of her works, the former Secretary General Dag Hammarskjöld, and which stands in the plaza of the United Nations building in New York City. It was commissioned by Jacob Blaustein, a former United States delegate to the U.N., in 1961 following Hammarskjöld's death in a plane crash.

On 20 December 2011, her 1969 sculpture Two Forms was stolen, from its plinth in Dulwich Park, South London. Suspicions are that the theft was by scrap metal thieves. The piece, which had been in the park since 1970, was insured for £500,000, a spokesman for Southwark Council said.

One of the editions of six of her 1964 bronze sculpture, Rock Form (Porthcurno), was removed from the Mander Centre in Wolverhampton in the spring of 2014 by its owners, the Royal Bank of Scotland and Dalancey Estates. Its sudden disappearance led to questions in Parliament in September 2014. Paul Uppal, Member of Parliament for Wolverhampton South West said: "When the Rock Form was donated by the Mander family, it was done so in the belief it would be enjoyed and cherished by the people of Wolverhampton for generations... It belongs to, and should be enjoyed by, the City of Wolverhampton." The sculpture has since been loaned to the city by RBS and can be seen in Wolverhampton City Art Gallery.

Recognition

Hepworth was awarded the Grand Prix at the 1959 São Paulo Art Biennial. She also was awarded the Freedom of St Ives in 1968 as an acknowledgment of her significant contributions to the town. She was awarded honorary degrees from the universities of Birmingham (1960), Leeds (1961), Exeter (1966), Oxford (1968), London (1970) and Manchester (1971).

She was appointed CBE in 1958 and DBE in 1965. In 1973 she was elected an honorary member of the American Academy of Arts and Letters. Following her death, her studio and home in St Ives became the Barbara Hepworth Museum, which came under control of the Tate in 1980.

In 2011 The Hepworth Wakefield opened in Hepworth's hometown of Wakefield, England. The Museum was designed by the architect David Chipperfield.

In January 2015 it was announced that Tate Britain was to stage the first big London show of Hepworth's work since 1968. It would bring together more than 70 of her works, including the major abstract carvings and bronzes for which she is best known. It would also include unseen photographs from the Hepworth archive, held by the Tate, including a self-photogram created in the 1930s and experimental photographic collages.

On 25 August 2020, Google honoured Hepworth with a Google Doodle. A Historic England blue plaque was unveiled in honour of Hepworth and first husband John Skeaping at 24 St Ann's Terrace, St John's Wood, London on 30 October 2020. The couple lived there in 1927.

The first major survey of Hepworth's work, Barbara Hepworth: In Equilibrium opens in November 2022 at Heide Museum of Modern Art in Melbourne. Her work had a wide influence on Australian sculpture.

Gallery

List of selected works

Marble portrait heads dating from London, ca. 1927, of Barbara Hepworth by John Skeaping, and of Skeaping by Hepworth, are documented by photograph in the Skeaping Retrospective catalogue, but are both believed to be lost.

Galleries and locations exhibiting her work
Two museums are named after Hepworth and have significant collections of her work: the Barbara Hepworth Museum in St Ives, Cornwall, and The Hepworth Wakefield in West Yorkshire. Her work also may be seen at:

 Birmingham Museum and Art Gallery, Birmingham 
 Glebelands, Harlow, Essex (namely Contrapuntal Forms)
 The University of Liverpool
 The University of Birmingham,
 The University of Exeter, Streatham Campus
 The University of Southampton, Highfield Campus
 St Catherine's College, Oxford,
 Three Obliques (Walk In) at Cardiff University School of Music,
 Yorkshire Sculpture Park in West Bretton, West Yorkshire
 Chesterfield, Derbyshire, behind the Royal Mail building (1 Future Walk, West Bars)
 Clare College, Cambridge,
 Churchill College, Cambridge
 Murray Edwards College, Cambridge
 Snape Maltings, Snape, Suffolk
 On the facade of the John Lewis department store, Oxford Street, London
 The Mander Centre, Wolverhampton (removed 2014)
 Mary and Leigh Block Museum of Art Sculpture Garden at Northwestern University
 Kenwood House, London
 Outside the Norwich Playhouse
 In the grounds of Winchester Cathedral next to The Pilgrims' School
 Leeds Art Gallery
 Tate Gallery, London
 Kröller-Müller Museum, Otterlo, Netherlands
 The Pier Arts Centre, Stromness, Orkney
 Museum of New Zealand Te Papa Tongarewa in Wellington, New Zealand
 Lynden Sculpture Garden, Milwaukee, Wisconsin
 Harrison Sculpture Garden at the Minnesota Landscape Arboretum
 The facade of Cheltenham House, Cheltenham
 Kimbell Art Museum, Fort Worth, Texas
 Art Institute of Chicago, Chicago, Illinois
 Dallas Museum of Art, Dallas, Texas
 Kettle's Yard, Cambridge
 Art Gallery of South Australia, Adelaide, Australia
 Whitechapel Gallery, London, England (8 April – 6 June 1954)

References

Further reading

 Penelope Curtis, Barbara Hepworth. Tate Publishing, .
 Barbara Hepworth, Hepworth, Barbara: A Pictorial Autobiography. Tate Publishing, .

Biographies

Monographs

Exhibition catalogues

External links

 
 
 Barbara Hepworth in the Tate Collection
 
 Barbara Hepworth's Sculpture Records, 1925–1975

1903 births
1975 deaths
20th-century British sculptors
20th-century English women artists
Accidental deaths in England
Alumni of Leeds Arts University
Alumni of the Royal College of Art
Artists from Wakefield
Dames Commander of the Order of the British Empire
Deaths from fire
English contemporary artists
English scenic designers
English women sculptors
Modern sculptors
Nicholson arts family
01
St Ives artists
Women stone carvers